Amana kuocangshanica is a Chinese plant species in the lily family,  native to Zhejiang Province in eastern China.

Amana kuocangshanica grows in moist places, frequently in bamboo forests. It is a bulb-forming herb up to 20 cm tall. Flowers are white with a green or spot in the center plus purple veins along the outside.

References

External links

Liliaceae
Flora of Zhejiang
Plants described in 2007